The 1940 United States presidential election in Oregon took place on November 5, 1940, as part of the 1940 United States presidential election. Voters chose five representatives, or electors, to the Electoral College, who voted for president and vice president.

Oregon was won by incumbent President Franklin D. Roosevelt (D–New York), running with Secretary of Agriculture Henry A. Wallace, with 53.70% of the popular vote, against Wendell Willkie (R–New York), running with Minority Leader and Oregon senior Senator Charles L. McNary, with 45.62% of the popular vote.

As of the 2020 presidential election, this is the last occasion when Malheur County has voted for a Democratic Presidential candidate.

Results

Results by county

See also
 United States presidential elections in Oregon

References

Oregon
1940
1940 Oregon elections